The Battle of Alsónyárasd, took place between 20 and 21 June 1849, in Alsónyárasd, as part of the Battle of Pered of the Summer Campaign of Hungarian War of Independence.

During the first day of the Battle of Pered the Csallóköz region played a secondary role, representing the marching ground and supply route of the Hungarian troops. After discussing, in the morning of 20 June with General Artúr Görgei about the plan for the incoming battle of Pered, agreed that Klapka had to advance towards Vásárút, and to tie down the Austrian troops from Csallóköz. The detached troops from the VIII. corps, led by General Klapka advanced towards Vásárút, his intention being to tie down the attention of the Austrians from Csallóköz. But at the same time the Austrian II. corps too, led by Lieutenant General Anton Csorich, was sent to tie down the Hungarian troops from Csallóköz, and prevent them to send reinforcements to the Vág river. They advanced on both banks of the Danube's Érsekújvár branch. On 20 June in the morning Lieutenant General Csorich, after leaving garrisons at the crossing points of Eperjes and Nádszeg, sent a column of 2 battalions 4 cavalry companies, and 18 cannons from Vásárút to Aszód, another column from Albár to Nagymegyer, and the Reischach brigade through Csilizatas to Nagymegyer. Klapka arrived with the Kosztolányi division to Aszód, deploying along both sides of the road heading to Gúta, and around the noon he was informed about the approach of the enemy. In order to avoid being attacked in the vicinity of the bridge, which he had to defend, he decided to advance toward the approaching enemy. For this purpose he sent Colonel Móric Kosztolányi with 2 battalions, 1 hussar company, and 4 cannons on the road to Gúta, Colonel Rohonczy with 3 companies of the newly founded Károlyi hussars and a cavalry battery through Királyfölde to Albár, Colonel count Zichy with a smaller column from Apácaszakállas to Alsónyárasd, and Colonel Janik had to follow Kosztolányi's and Rohonczy's columns as a reserve, with the 64. and 18. battalions, a cavalry company, and 4 cannons.

When Csorich's left column arrived at Alsónyárasd, he was informed about the approach of the Hungarians, so he deployed his troops he deployed his infantry in the village and the small woods near the Little Danube, the cavalry on the right flank, outside the village, while the artillery remained, for now, behind Alsónyárasd. The commander of the cavalry, colonel Rohonczy, attacked, and took control over the above mentioned small woods, and right when he was preparing to attack Alsónyárasd, he was attacked by 2 companies of Civalart Uhlans and 2 companies of the Liechtenstein Chevau-léger regiment, which forced the Károlyi hussars to retreat. Klapka sent a company of the Hunyady hussars against the Austrian cavalrymen pursuing the retreating Károlyi hussars, and with the help of a battery, they managed to stop them. Meanwhile, Rohonczy reorganized his hussars and sent them again to attack, but they were repulsed again. At this moment the Austrian infantry broke out of Nyárasd, forcing the Károlyi hussars, also threatened from the left by the Austrian cavalry, to retreat. The Austrian cavalry pursued Kosztolányi's retreating 2 battalions, pushing back again also the hussars' which tried to stop them. As a result of this the situation of Klapka's troops became critical. Luckily the much waited Janik's and Zichy's columns finally arrived, thanks to which Klapka reorganized his troops. Seeing this, Csorich ordered his troops to retreat from the battlefield in the direction of Vásárút, while Klapka retreated towards Aszód. to defend the bridges at Aszódpuszta and Guta. So ended the first day of the Battle.

On the 20th, Lieutenant General Csorics received orders from Haynau to facilitate Wohlgemuth's attack the following day, with the bulk of the Liebler Brigade and Simbschen's cavalry brigade to make an offensive movement on the left bank of the Danube at Ersekújvár through Nádszeg towards Seregakol, i.e. to the flanks and rear of the Hungarians, while from Vásárút towards Aszód he was to confine himself to a strong demonstration. But pointing at the weakness of Csorich's forces and the great distance to be covered, he completely abandoned the offensive movement on the left bank, and on the 21st he decided to carry out only a demonstration in Csallóköz; but even this he started late, only in the afternoon of the 21st.

On 21 June at the bridge from Aszód, Klapka, with the detached units of the VIII. Hungarian corps, confined himself to defense, deploying, under the leadership of Colonel Móric Kosztolányi, 2 battalions with 4 three-pounder cannons, 1000 paces from the bridge, on the road to Gúta towards Nyárasd; and 2 infantry battalions, 4 cavalry companies and a cavalry battery under the leadership of Colonel Janik around Aszód; the two groupings were linked to each other by 1 cavalry company; while the smaller column of Colonel count Zichy remained at Apácaszakállas. The Austrian column sent against Aszód arrived there between 6 and 7 p.m., forcing the vanguard of Kosztolányi to retreat. At 7:00 p.m., right when the vanguard of the retreating II. Hungarian corps arrived at the bridge from Aszód, General Sigmund von Reischach (or Barco) deployed his artillery against Kosztolányi's artillery, which, despite its numerical inferiority, withstood the enemy fire, but when 2 of its cannons became unusable, the Hungarians were forced to retreat. Luckily right at this moment a half battery and two companies of the Württemberg hussars, sent by Görgei, arrived on the battlefield, thanks to which Klapka reoccupied the lost positions, then continued the artillery duel with the Austrians until nightfall. Thanks to this, the II. Hungarian corps, retreating from the Battle of Pered, crossed the bridge from Aszód without any problem, escaping the pursuing enemy troops, then Klapka ordered the destruction of the bridge to prevent the enemy from crossing the Érsekújvár Danube branch.

Explanatory notes

Notes

Sources
 

 
 

Pered
Pered
Pered
Military history of Hungary
History of the Trnava Region
Conflicts in 1849